Dubilier is the surname of the following notable people:
Martin H. Dubilier (1926–1991), American businessman and inventor
Clayton, Dubilier & Rice, American private equity company founded by Martin
Nicole Dubilier, American marine microbiologist 
William Dubilier (1888–1969), American electronics inventor, father of Martin
Dubilier Condenser Company founded by William